The Sport Complex Podillia (also known as the Podillia Stadium; ; Sportyvnyĭ kompleks "Podillia") is a sports facility in Khmelnytskyi, Ukraine. 

The stadium is the central stadium in Khmelnytskyi Oblast and a home stadium of Ukrainian football club Podillia Khmelnytskyi.

The stadium is located in the city's centre near the Franko City Park, a city hospital, and the Border Service Academy.

Beside football competitions, the stadium is being actively used for various track and field (light athletics) competitions.

Gallery

References

External links 
Unofficial website of Podillya - Pictures of the Stadium 
Podillia Sports Complex. FC Podillia Khmelnytskyi.

1950 establishments in Ukraine
Podillya
Podillya
Podillya
Buildings and structures in Khmelnytskyi Oblast
Sport in Khmelnytskyi, Ukraine
Sport in Khmelnytskyi Oblast
Sports complexes in Ukraine